K. T. Achuthan (April 1911 – 8 January 1999) was an Indian politician from Kerala and a leader in the Indian National Congress. He served as Minister for Transport & Labour in both R. Sankar ministry and Pattom Thanu Pillai ministry.

Biography 
Shri. K.T. Achuthan, advocate and senior Congress leader, was born as the son of Shri. Theyyan Vaidyar and Smt. Madhavi in April 1911. Shri Achuthan had served as a Member of Kochi Legislative Assembly from 1943 to 1949, and Travancore-Cochin Legislative Assembly from 1949 to 1951.

Political career  
Shri Achuthan became elected to the second Kerala Legislative Assembly in 1960, contesting from Nattika constituency as a Congress candidate. Shri. Achuthan held the portfolio of Transport and Labour in the Pattom Thanu Pillai Ministry from 22-2-1960 to 26-9-1962. He was the Minister for Transport and Labour in the R. Sankar cabinet too, from 26-9-1962 to 10-9-1964. He had also served for a term as a Member of the Lok Sabha, from 1952 to 1957.

In the course of a long political career, Shri. Achuthan has held several important positions in different walks of life. He was Member, Municipal Council, Irinjalakuda and General Secretary, Cochin SNDP Yogam.

Marriage and children 
Smt. Savithri was his wife and they have four sons and three daughters.

Death 
Achuthan died on 8 January 1999 at the age of 87. The Assembly paid tribute to him on 26 February 1999.

References 

1911 births
1999 deaths
Kerala politicians
Malayali politicians
Kerala MLAs 1960–1964
India MPs 1952–1957